Wen Hsia (20 May 1928 – 6 April 2022) was a Taiwanese singer and actor.

Personal life
Wen Hsia was born Wang Jui-ho in 1928, in present-day Madou District, Tainan, and studied music in Japan. He was married to Wen Hsiang, who was also a singer. Wen Hsia died in his sleep on 6 April 2022, aged 93.

Career
From the 1950s to the 1960s, Wen Hsia was known for his covers of Japanese melodies featuring Taiwanese Hokkien lyrics, a practice that began in the 1930s. He also sang in Japanese. Over the course of his career, Wen Hsia wrote more than 2,000 songs. During martial law in Taiwan, Hokkien pop was heavily censored and Wen Hsia became known as the "king of banned songs." Wen Hsia recorded over 1,200 songs, of which 99 were banned by Kuomintang authorities. His 1961 work, "Mama, I’m Brave" was banned for thirty years, setting a record for the longest period a Hokkien pop song was prohibited. Wen Hsia's songs became regarded as classics. At the 23rd Golden Melody Awards in 2012, Wen Hsia received the Golden Melody Lifetime Contribution Award.

As an actor, Wen Hsia starred in Joseph Kuo's remakes of the Japanese Wataridori film series, in which the protagonist was originally portrayed by Akira Kobayashi.

References

External links

1928 births
2022 deaths
Taiwanese people of Hoklo descent
Taiwanese Hokkien pop singers
Japanese-language singers
20th-century Taiwanese  male singers
20th-century Taiwanese male actors
Taiwanese male film actors
Musicians from Tainan
Male actors from Tainan
Taiwanese expatriates in Japan